Virginie Polyxène Augustine Philippe Dallemagne, a French miniature painter, whose maiden name was Decagny, was a native of Beauvais. She was a pupil of Madame de Mirbel, and showed much talent in the execution of portraits in miniature and in crayons. She married Adolphe Dallemagne, a landscape painter, and died at Corbeil in 1876.

References
 

1821 births
1875 deaths
Portrait miniaturists
People from Beauvais
French women painters
19th-century French painters
19th-century French women artists